The South Australian Railways 620 class was a class of 4-6-2 steam locomotives operated by the South Australian Railways.

History

The completion of the South Australian Railway (SAR) broad gauge route between Adelaide and Port Pirie created a need for a fast, light passenger locomotive to haul this service, as well as other traffic on the lightly laid  rail branch lines of the SAR.

Fred Shea, Chief Mechanical Engineer of the SAR designed a  Pacific type. A notable feature of the design, unique to South Australian Railways, was the use of Baker valve gear in lieu of the more common Walschaerts valve gear. The first locomotive was completed at the Islington Railway Workshops in 1936, with the last completed in 1938.

Class leader 620 was also notable for being Australia's first streamlined locomotive, the smokebox being covered with a chromed steel grille similar to those fitted to motor cars of the period, painted in resplendent Hawthorn Green and Silver. The press of the time described 620's appearance as 'a bit of fluff'. The remainder of the class was unstreamlined.

In service, the 620 class replaced the Q and S classes on branchline services, where they proved quite successful. With the introduction of the more powerful and modern 520 class from 1943, these locomotives were relegated to the Willunga, Bridgewater and Tailem Bend passenger services, as well as continued service on Murray Mallee line services (the locomotives' light axle loading providing good route ability plus the "get up and go" characteristics common to large wheeled Pacific type locomotives.

The 620 class was phased out in favour of Bluebird railcars, although a spate of railcar failures in 1954–55 saw the 620 class return to service on the Port Pirie line. All were withdrawn between 1964 and 1969.

Preservation
Two have been preserved:
621 by SteamRanger
624 by the National Railway Museum, Port Adelaide

In 1994, 621 ran a one-off steam hauled tour into Victoria shortly before the Adelaide to Melbourne line was converted from broad gauge to a standard gauge. This was the first and only time a South Australian Railways steam locomotive had worked east into Victoria and with the gauge conversion imminent, the tour would also be the last. The train travelled as far east as Bacchus Marsh, due to the locomotive being too wide for the stations situated along the Melbourne suburban railway system. The locomotive combined with R761 for the majority of the tour from Wolseley in South Australia to Bacchus Marsh in Victoria.

Class list

References

Specific

External links

South Australian Railways (SAR) promotional photograph of streamlined locomotive 620 Sir Winston Duggan
State Library of South Australia photograph of streamlined locomotive 620 Sir Winston Duggan travelling through the Mount Lofty Ranges, South Australia
620class:SA:Trains:AJH Photographs and further details of the 620 class courtesy John Hurst

Railway locomotives introduced in 1936
620 class
4-6-2 locomotives
Broad gauge locomotives in Australia
Streamlined steam locomotives
Passenger locomotives